US Naval Ordnance Testing Facility Observation Tower No. 2, also known as Queen's Grant Tower, is a historic building located at Topsail Island, Pender County, North Carolina. It was built in 1946 by Kellex Corporation, and is a reinforced concrete structure. The interior stairs have been removed. It was one of seven observation towers built to house carefully calibrated monitoring equipment for "Operation Bumblebee."

It was listed on the National Register of Historic Places in 1993.

References

Military facilities on the National Register of Historic Places in North Carolina
Buildings and structures completed in 1946
Buildings and structures in Pender County, North Carolina
National Register of Historic Places in Pender County, North Carolina